Middleton House, also known as the Chatham–Hanes House and R. Philip Hanes Jr. House, is a historic home located at Winston-Salem, Forsyth County, North Carolina.  It was built about 1829, and located on a hill overlooking
the Savannah River in northwestern South Carolina. The two-story, five bay, Federal style frame dwelling was dismantled and moved to its present site in 1930. It was subsequently reconstructed by architect William Roy Wallace and set in a landscape designed by Ellen Biddle Shipman.  The front facade features a two-tier, center-bay porch with graceful Tuscan order columns. Also on the property is the contributing compatible garage/apartment (c. 1930).  The house and grounds are owned by Wake Forest University.

It was listed on the National Register of Historic Places in 2000.

References

External links
"Wake Forest may sell land for home development," Triad Business Journal,  May 4, 2012
"Historic home is donated to Wake," Winston-Salem Journal, February 1, 2011; December 11, 2012

Wake Forest University
Houses on the National Register of Historic Places in North Carolina
Federal architecture in North Carolina
Houses completed in 1930
Houses in Winston-Salem, North Carolina
National Register of Historic Places in Winston-Salem, North Carolina